The 2013–14 Michigan Wolverines women's basketball team will represent University of Michigan during the 2013–14 NCAA Division I women's basketball season. The Wolverines, led by second year head coach Kim Barnes Arico, play their home games at the Crisler Center and were members of the Big Ten Conference. They finished with a record of 20–14 overall, 8–8 in Big Ten play for a tie for sixth place. They lost in the quarterfinals in the 2014 Big Ten Conference women's basketball tournament against their in-state rivalry Michigan State. They were invited to the 2014 Women's National Invitation Tournament which they defeated Stony Brook in the first round, Duquesne in the second round and losing to Bowling Green in the third round.

Roster

Schedule

|-
!colspan=9 | Exhibition

|-
!colspan=9| Regular Season

|-
!colspan=9 | 2014 Big Ten Conference women's tournament

|-
!colspan=9 | 2014 WNIT

Source

See also
2013–14 Michigan Wolverines men's basketball team

Rankings

References

Michigan
Michigan Wolverines women's basketball seasons
2014 Women's National Invitation Tournament participants
Michigan
Michigan